Tigers may refer to one of several sports teams:

Australia
Richmond Football Club, a Victorian based Australian rules football team
Wests Tigers (2000-), a south western sydney-based rugby league team formed by a merger between Western Suburbs Magpies & the Balmain Tigers
Claremont Tigers, a Perth-based Australian rules football team
Eastern Suburbs Tigers, a Brisbane rugby league team
Glenelg Tigers, a South Australian based Australian rules football team
Hobart Tigers, a Tasmanian Australian rules football team
Nightcliff Football Club, a Darwin based Australian rules football team in the Northern Territory Football League
Queanbeyan Football Club, an Australian rules football club that compete in the AFL Canberra competition.
Melbourne Tigers, a Melbourne basketball team
Balmain Tigers (1909–2000), a Sydney-based former rugby league team which merged with Western Suburbs Magpies to become the Wests Tigers in 2000. No longer represented in senior rugby league
Mayne Australian Football Club, an Australian rules football team

Bangladesh
Bangladesh national cricket team
Chittagong Tigers, a franchise cricket team in the Bangladesh Premier League

Canada
Medicine Hat Tigers, a junior ice hockey team in the Western Hockey League
Hamilton Tigers (1873–1950), a Canadian football team now called the Hamilton Tiger-Cats
Hamilton Tigers (1920–1925), a former National Hockey League professional ice hockey team
Calgary Tigers (1920–27, 1932–36), a Western Canada Hockey League team
Dalhousie Tigers, the varsity sports teams of Dalhousie University
Campbellton Tigers a junior A hockey team in the Maritime Junior A Hockey League
Victoriaville Tigres, a junior ice hockey team in the Quebec Major Junior Hockey League

England
Hull City A.F.C., an association football club
Castleford Tigers, a rugby league club
Leicester Tigers, a rugby union club
Brighton Tigers (1935–1965), an ice hockey team
Telford Tigers, an Ice Hockey Team

Finland
Kokkola Tigers, a volleyball team
Tampere Tigers, a baseball team
Tikkurila Tigers, a floorball team

Japan
Hanshin Tigers, a Koshien-based baseball team owned by Hanshin Electric Railway Co.

Mexico
Tigres UANL, an association football club based in Monterrey, Nuevo León.
Quintana Roo Tigers, a baseball team located in Cancun, Quintana Roo, Mexico.

Nigeria
D'Tigers, nickname for Nigeria's national basketball team.

Norway
Frisk Tigers, an ice hockey club

Philippines
Davao Occidental Tigers, a professional basketball team from the Maharlika Pilipinas Basketball League based in Malita, Davao Occidental
UST Growling Tigers, team name of the University of Santo Tomas Athletics

Poland
Kraków Tigers, an American football team

Slovenia
Domžale Tigers, an American football team

South Africa
Cape Town Tigers, is a  basketball club based in Cape Town.
Ikey Tigers, a rugby union team from the University of Cape Town.

South Korea
Kia Tigers, a Korea Baseball Organization team based in Gwangju City.
Ulsan Hyundai FC, a K League 1 team based in Ulsan City.

Switzerland
SCL Tigers, a ice hockey organization based in Switzerland

United States
Auburn Tigers, team name of the Auburn University Athletics
Cincinnati Bengals, a National Football League team
Clemson Tigers, team name of the Clemson University Athletics
Colorado College Tigers, team name of Colorado College, Colorado Springs, Colorado
Detroit Tigers, a Major League baseball team 
DePauw Tigers, team name of DePauw University Athletics
East Central Tigers, team name of East Central University (Oklahoma) Athletics
Fort Hays State Tigers, team name of Fort Hays State University Athletics
Grambling State Tigers, team name of Grambling State University Athletics
Hampden-Sydney Tigers, team name of Hampden-Sydney College Athletics
Jackson State Tigers, team name of Jackson State University Athletics
Lincoln Blue Tigers, team name of Lincoln University in Missouri Athletics
LSU Tigers, team name of the Louisiana State University Athletics
Memphis Tigers, team name of University of Memphis athletics
Missouri Tigers, team name of the University of Missouri Athletics
Occidental College Tigers, team name of Occidental College Athletics 
Ouachita Baptist Tigers, team name of Ouachita Baptist University Athletics
Pacific Tigers, team name of the University of the Pacific Athletics
Princeton Tigers, team name and mascot of the Princeton University Athletics Department
RCC Tigers, team name and mascot of Riverside City College, Riverside, California
RIT Tigers, team name and mascot of Rochester Institute of Technology, Rochester, New York
Savannah State Tigers, team name of Savannah State University athletics
Tennessee State Tigers, team name of Tennessee State University athletics
Texas Southern Tigers, team name of Texas Southern University athletics
Towson Tigers, team name of Towson University Athletics
Trinity University Tigers, team name of Trinity University athletic program
West Alabama Tigers, team name of the University of West Alabama athletic program

See also
 The Tigers (disambiguation)
 Tiger (disambiguation)